Xinjing is a town of Jingxi, Guangxi, China. , it has 9 residential communities and 21 villages under its administration.

References

Towns of Guangxi
Jingxi, Guangxi
Towns and townships in Baise